Heartland Music Presents Creedence Clearwater Revival is a compilation album of numbers recorded by the American rock band Creedence Clearwater Revival. It was released in 1992 by Heartland Music.

CD 1
 Proud Mary – 3:07
 Born on the Bayou – 5:15
 Down on the Corner – 2:46
 Lookin' Out My Back Door – 2:34
 Bootleg – 3:02
 Hey Tonight – 2:43
 Have You Ever Seen the Rain? – 2:40
 Travelin' Band – 2:07
 Don't Look Now (It Ain't You or Me) – 2:18
 Hello Mary Lou (Goodbye Heart) – 2:15
 The Midnight Special – 4:13
 I Heard It Through the Grapevine (edited version) – 3:48
 Run Through the Jungle – 3:05
 Susie Q (Part 1) – 4:33

CD 2
 Good Golly Miss Molly – 2:42
 Commotion – 2:44
 Lodi – 3:13
 It Came Out of the Sky – 2:56
 I Put a Spell on You – 4:32
 Ooby Dooby – 2:07
 Night Time Is the Right Time – 3:09
 Fortunate Son – 2:18
 Bad Moon Rising – 2:21
 Green River – 2:34
 Cotton Fields – 2:57
 Long As I Can See the Light – 3:31
 Someday Never Comes – 4:00
Who'll Stop the Rain – 2:27
 Up Around the Bend – 2:41
Sweet Hitchhiker – 2:56

Creedence Clearwater Revival compilation albums
1992 compilation albums
Albums produced by John Fogerty
Albums produced by Stu Cook
Albums produced by Doug Clifford
Albums produced by Saul Zaentz